Qaraağaclı, Qırmızı Samux (?-2018) is a village and municipality in the Samukh Rayon of Azerbaijan.
Nearby towns are:

It has a population of 2,319.

References 

Populated places in Samukh District